The mountain wheatear or mountain chat (Myrmecocichla monticola) is a small insectivorous passerine bird that is endemic to southwestern Africa.

Range and habitat
This non-migratory wheatear is resident in mountainous and rocky habitats in Namibia, Botswana, South Africa and southernmost Angola.

Description
Mountain wheatear is 18–20 cm long, and like other wheatears, it has a distinctive tail pattern, with a white rump and outer tail feathers. Its legs and pointed bill are black. The male is very variable in plumage, although the tail pattern and a white shoulder patch are always present. A white and black bird. The body plumage varies from pale grey to almost black, and it may or may not have a white crown to the head. The female is entirely dark brown apart from the white rump and outer tail.

Habits
The mountain wheatear's song is a clear melodic whistle interspersed with harsh chatters. It is monogamous and nests on the ground amongst rocks, laying 2-4 white eggs. It eats insects and berries.

Taxonomy
Along with other chats, this species was formerly classed as a member of the thrush family Turdidae, but based on studies published in 2004 and 2010, the Old World flycatcher family Muscicapidae is now preferred. The mountain wheatear was formerly placed in the genus Oenanthe. Molecular phylogenetic studies published in 2010 and 2012 found that the species was not closely related to the other members of Oenanthe and instead was genetically similar to the chats in the genus Myrmecocichla. The species was therefore assigned to Myrmecocichla.

Gallery

References

Ian Sinclair, Phil Hockey and Warwick Tarboton, SASOL Birds of Southern Africa (Struik 2002)

External links
 Xeno-canto: audio recordings of the mountain wheatear
 Mountain chat - Species text in The Atlas of Southern African Birds.

Myrmecocichla
Wheatears
Birds of Southern Africa
Birds described in 1818
Taxa named by Louis Jean Pierre Vieillot